Von Wörndle is a surname. Notable people with the surname include:

 Philip von Wörndle (1755–1818), Tyrolese rebel commander against Napoleon
 Edmund von Wörndle (1827–1906), Austrian landscape painter
 August von Wörndle (1829–1902), Austrian painter

See also
 Wörndle